The Rivière à Mars Nord-Ouest is a tributary of the rivière à Mars flowing in the unorganized territory of Lac-Pikauba, in the Charlevoix Regional County Municipality, in the administrative region of Capitale-Nationale, in the province of Quebec, Canada. The "rivière à Mars North-West" crosses the central-western part of the Laurentides Wildlife Reserve.

Upstream of the port, industrial and urban area, the "rivière à Mars" valley is mainly served by the "Consol Paper road". The "rivière à Mars North West" is served by a few other secondary forest roads for forestry and recreational tourism activities.

Forestry is the main economic activity in this valley; recreational tourism, second.

The surface of the "rivière à Mars North-West" is usually frozen from the beginning of December to the end of March, however the safe circulation on the ice is generally made from mid-December to mid-March.

Geography 
The main watersheds adjacent to the "rivière à Mars North-West" are:
 north side: rivière à Mars, rivière à Pierre, Lake Ha! Ha!;
 east side: rivière à Mars, Goéland lake, Stymphale lake, Goéland stream, Colon lake;
 south side: Lac à Mars, "Lac des Bouleaux", "Lac des Pas Perdus", "Grand lac des Enfers", Creek Philippe;
 west side: Pikauba Lake, Cyriac River, Marchand lake, rivière du Moulin, Hell lake, Georges lake.

The "rivière à Mars North-West" rises at the mouth of lac à Mars in the Laurentides Wildlife Reserve. This source is located at:
  east of a mountain peak reaching ;
  north of "Lac des Bouleaux";
  west of the course of the rivière à Mars;
  east of a bay on Pikauba Lake;
  south of the confluence of the northwest Mars river and the rivière à Mars.

From its source, the "rivière à Mars North-West" flows on  generally towards the north, with a drop of  entirely in the forest zone, according to the segments following:
  northward, to the outlet (coming from the northwest) of "Lac Cloc-Cloc" and "Petit Lac Cloc-Cloc";
  north to the outlet (coming from the south-east) of Lake Potvin;
  north to the outlet (coming from the west) of Lac Marchand;
  towards the north, winding up to the stream (coming from the south-east);
  towards the north, collecting at the beginning of the segment (i.e. a hundred meters downstream) a stream (coming from the northwest), then the northeast, by unevening  and meandering to the outlet of Lac des Écores (coming from the northwest);
  first towards the north-east to a bend in the river, then on  towards the south-east by winding up to a stream ( coming from the west);
  by winding towards the northeast, then towards the east by collecting a stream (coming from the south), to its mouth.
The "rivière à Mars North-West" flows in a river loop on the west bank of the rivière à Mars. This confluence is located at:
  northeast of "Lac de l'Enfer";
  north-west of Lake Cinto;
  north of Lac Marchand;
  south-west of Lake Ha! Ha!;
  south-east of Kenogami Lake;
  south of the confluence of the rivière à Mars and Baie des Ha! Ha!;
  south-east of downtown Saguenay (city).

From the confluence of the "rivière à Mars North-West", the current descends the course of the rivière à Mars on  generally towards the north, crosses the Baie des Ha!

Toponymy 
The toponym “Rivière à Mars Nord-Ouest” is associated with its tributary “Rivière à Mars”. These two names evoke the first pioneer Mars Simard to settle around the 1870s near the rivière à Mars, on the Baie des Ha! Ha!. The toponym “Rivière à Mars Nord-Ouest” appeared on the draft map of Lac Pikauba, 1961-09-15, item 75 and on the draft map of Baie-St-Paul, 1961-06-30, item 251.

The toponym "Rivière à Mars Nord-Ouest" was formalized on December 5, 1968, at the Place Names Bank of the Commission de toponymie du Québec.

See also 
 List of rivers of Quebec

References 

Rivers of Capitale-Nationale
Charlevoix Regional County Municipality
Laurentides Wildlife Reserve